Jefferys Allen (1760 – 23 August 1844) was a British politician and the Member of Parliament for Bridgwater from 1796 to 1804.

See also
 List of MPs in the first United Kingdom Parliament

References

1760 births
1844 deaths
British MPs 1796–1800
UK MPs 1801–1802
Members of the Parliament of Great Britain for English constituencies
Members of the Parliament of the United Kingdom for English constituencies